The University of Nueva Caceres–Bataan, formerly the Bataan Peninsula Educational Institution, is a private, non-sectarian, coeducational higher education institution owned and operated by Bataan Peninsula Educational Institution Inc. in Dinalupihan, Bataan, Philippines. It was founded in 2014 and offers senior high school education and undergraduate courses.

References

External links
University of Nueva Caceres

Universities and colleges in Bataan
Educational institutions established in 2014
University of Nueva Caceres
2014 establishments in the Philippines